Tommy Atkins is a 1928 British silent drama film directed by Norman Walker and starring Lillian Hall-Davis, Henry Victor and Walter Byron. Based on the eponymous play by Arthur Shirley and Ben Landeck, it features a romantic drama against the backdrop of the British intervention in The Sudan in the 1880s.

Plot
A cleric enlists on learning he loves his brother's sweetheart, saves his life, and finds he is really an Earl.

Cast
 Lillian Hall-Davis as Ruth
 Henry Victor as Victor
 Walter Byron as Harold
 Shayle Gardner as Mason
 Jerrold Robertshaw as Earl
 Pat Courtney as Ruth as a Child
 Leslie Tomlinson as Victor as a Child
 Alfred Leonard as Harold as a Child

References

External links

1928 films
1920s historical drama films
1920s war drama films
Films shot at British International Pictures Studios
1920s English-language films
Films directed by Norman Walker
British silent feature films
British romantic drama films
British war drama films
British historical drama films
Films set in Sudan
Films set in the 19th century
Films set in the 1880s
British black-and-white films
British historical romance films
1928 romantic drama films
1920s British films
Silent romantic drama films
Silent war drama films